The 1966–67 Segunda División season was the 36th since its establishment and was played between 11 September 1966 and 23 April 1967.

Overview before the season
32 teams joined the league, including 3 relegated from the 1965–66 La Liga and 4 promoted from the 1965–66 Tercera División.

Relegated from La Liga
Málaga
Mallorca
Real Betis

Promoted from Tercera División
Ferrol
Gimnástica Torrelavega
Logroñés
Castellón

Group North

Teams

League table

Top goalscorers

Top goalkeepers

Results

Group South

Teams

League table

Top goalscorers

Top goalkeepers

Results

Promotion playoffs

First leg

Second leg

Relegation playoffs

First leg

Second leg

External links
BDFútbol

Segunda División seasons
2
Spain